The Parascylliidae, or collared carpet sharks, are a family of sharks only found in shallow waters of the western Pacific.  They are relatively small sharks, with the largest species reaching no more than 91.0 cm in adult length. They have elongated, slender bodies, cat-like eyes, and barbels behind their chins. They feed on small fish and invertebrates.

See also

 List of sharks

References

 
Shark families
Taxa named by Theodore Gill